Air Chief Marshal Zulfiqar Ali Khan (Urdu: ذوالفقار علی خان; 10 December 1930 – 8 March 2005) , was a four-star air officer in the Pakistan Air Force and later a diplomat.

He is noted as a first four-star air officer  who commanded the Pakistan Air Force as its Chief of Air Staff from 15 April 1974 to 22 July 1978. Upon retirement, he served on a diplomatic assignment, and headed the diplomatic mission in the United States as a Pakistan Ambassador from 1989 until 1990.

Biography

Zulfikar Ali Khan was born in Lahore, Punjab, British India, on 10 December 1930. He attended a local school in Lahore where he did his matriculation.

From 1947, he attended the Military College Jhelum but joined the Pakistan Air Force in 1948 when he made a transfer to the Pakistan Air Force Academy in Risalpur, NWFP in Pakistan. He gained commissioned in the Air Force as a P/Off. and passed out from the PAF Academy in 1950 in the class of 7th GD pilot course (GD(P) Course) on 21 December 1950. IN 1956, Flt-Lt. Khan first command assignment was to No. 20 Squadron Eagles.

In the 1960s, Squadron-Leader Khan was educated at the Air War College where he gained a degree in staff course. In 1965, Sq-Ldr. Zulfikar Ali Khan participated in the second war with India in 1965 where he commanded No. 9 Squadron Griffins against the Indian Air Force. From 1966 to 1968, Wg-Cdr. Zulfiqar Ali Khan was posted in the Foreign ministry and briefly tenured as air attaché at the High Commission of Pakistan in New Delhi led by H.E. Arshad Hussain.

In 1968–71, he was promoted as Group-Captain in the Air Force and was posted in East Pakistan where he was appointed as officer commanding of operations wing of Dacca Air Base under its Air Officer Commanding Air Cdre. Inamul Haq. Air Cdre. Khan participated in liberation war that took place in East Pakistan, serving against the Indian Air Force.

Gp-Capt. Khan was taken war prisoner by the Indian Army after the Eastern Command was surrendered by its GOC-in-C Lieutenant-General A.A.K. Niazi. In 1973, he was repatriated to Pakistan and was allowed to continue his military service and was promoted to a one-star rank, Air-Commodore, and took over the Air Force Academy as its Commandant in 1973, but later posted as commandant of the Air War College for a short time.

His command assignment included the command as an Officer commanding of No. 11 Squadron Arrows, No. 9 Sq. Griffins, and AOC of the Sargodha Air Force Base.

Chief of Air Staff
In 1974, Air-Cdre. Zulfiqar Ali Khan was promoted as Air Vice Marshal in the Air Force, and was appointed as Deputy Chief of the Air Staff of Aerial Planning (DCAS(P)) at the Air Headquarters (AHQ) in Islamabad but was later posted as Director-General of Air Operations (DGAO).

On 14 April 1974, AVM Zulfiqar Ali Khan was surprisingly appointed second Chief of Air Staff to take over the command of the Air Force as an Air-Marshal. The appointment was controversial since Air-Marshal Zafar Chaudhry resigned from his service, and Air-Mshl. Khan had succeeded seven senior air officers in the Air Force.

In 1975, he helped established the Northern Air Command based in PAF Base Kalabagh, oversaw the induction of MiG-15 as jet trainer, establishment of the Air Defence Command, and provided his support to rebuilt Mirage III aircraft at the Pakistan Aeronautical Complex.

On 1 January 1976, Air-Mshl. Khan was elevated and promoted to four-star rank, Air Chief Marshal, becoming the first four-star rank officer in the Pakistan Air Force. ACM Zulfiqar Ali Khan was then made senior member of the Joint Chiefs of Staff Committee, and honored with the NI(M) for meritorious services. During this same time, ACM Zulfikar Ali Khan helped establish the Combat Commanders' School set up under Gp-Capt. Cecil Chaudhry.

Over the issue of clandestine atomic bomb programme, ACM Zulfiqar Ali Khan reportedly advised Prime Minister Bhutto against the acquisition of the aging A-7 and F-5 military aircraft in order to stop the work on the Reprocessing plant for plutonium development, noting that "atomic bomb programme should not stop for any reason be compromised."

On 5 July 1978, ACM Zulfikar Ali Khan was appointed Deputy CMLA along with naval chief Admiral Moh'd Sharif, army chief General Zia-ul-Haq, and Chairman joint chiefs General Muh'd Shariff after the military coup d'état against the civilian government led by Prime Minister Bhutto.

On 22 July 1978, ACM Zulfiqar Ali Khan tendered his resignation from the command of the air force over the disagreement with the military take over of the civilian government, and handed over the command to newly appointed Air Chief Marshal Anwar Shamim.

Foreign service

Upon retirement, Zulfikar Ali Khan joined the Foreign Service and was appointed Pakistan Ambassador to Switzerland which he tenured from 1979 until 1981.

In 1989, he was appointed as chief investigator to lead investigations on possible military funding to political parties by the intelligence community.

In 1989, Prime Minister Benazir Bhutto appointed him as the Pakistan Ambassador to the United States and took over the charge shortly in Washington DC. However, his tenureship was marked with controversy involving the continuation of atomic deterrence which he failed to cover-up in the United States. In 1990, he was removed from his post and returned to Pakistan after serving as ambassador for only a year.

Death
On 8 March 2005, Air Chief Marshal Zulfiqar Ali Khan died of cardiac arrest in Islamabad when he suffered a heart attack at his residence and was taken to the PAF Hospital, but the doctors pronounced him dead. He was given a state funeral with full honours. Begum Sajida Zulifqar, wife of Air Chief Marshal Zulifqar Ali Khan, died on 30 September 2012 and her funeral prayers were attended by all former PAF Air Chiefs, politicians, bureaucrats, senior serving and retired military officials and a large number of people from all walks of life.

Awards and decorations

Foreign Decorations

References

External links
 Bio of Air Marshal Zulfiqar Ali Khan
 PAF s' Chief of the Air Staffs
 Air Marshal Zulfiqar Ali Khan, Former chief of air staff, dies

|-

1930 births
2005 deaths
Punjabi people
People from Lahore
Pakistan Air Force Academy alumni
Pakistani aviators
Pakistan Air Force officers
Pakistani military personnel of the Indo-Pakistani War of 1971
Air marshals of the Indo-Pakistani War of 1971
Pakistani prisoners of war
Pakistan Air Force air marshals
Ambassadors of Pakistan to Switzerland
Ambassadors of Pakistan to the United States
Pakistani air attachés